The men's team épée competition at the 2002 Asian Games in Busan, South Korea was held on 2 October 2002 at the Gangseo Gymnasium.

Kazakhstan (Alexandr Axenov, Dmitriy Dimov, Sergey Shabalin and Alexey Shipilov) won the gold medal after beating China (Wang Lei, Xie Younjun, Zhao Chunsheng and Zhao Gang) in final in extra time. South Korean team (Kim Jeong-gwan, Ku Kyo-dong, Lee Sang-yup and Yang Roy-sung) won the bronze medal.

Schedule
All times are Korea Standard Time (UTC+09:00)

Results

Final standing

References
2002 Asian Games Report, Page 406

External links
 Official website

Men Epee